The 2007 Russian First Division was the 16th edition of Russian First Division. There were 22 teams.

Teams

League table

Top goalscorers

See also
2007 Russian Premier League
2007 Russian Second Division

References
 PFL

2
Russian First League seasons
Russia
Russia